Thecacera picta is a species of sea slug, a nudibranch, a shell-less marine gastropod mollusk in the family Polyceridae.

The type locality for this species is Suruga Bay, Japan.

References

External links 
 http://www.seaslugforum.net/factsheet/thecpict
 

Polyceridae
Gastropods described in 1972